Slyusar is a surname of Ukrainian origin meaning "locksmith", which may refer to:

Antonina Slyusar (born 1963), Ukrainian/Soviet sprint athlete and runner at the 1994 European Championships
Igor Slyusar (born 1989), Ukrainian ice hockey player
Irina Slyusar (born 1963), Ukrainian/Soviet sprint athlete and twin sister of Antonina
Valentyn Slyusar (born 1977), Ukrainian footballer
Vadym Slyusar (born 1964), Ukrainian/Soviet scientist
Yury Slyusar (born 1974), CEO of United Aircraft Corporation

See also
 

Ukrainian-language surnames